Anil Mehta is an Indian cinematographer, film director and writer who predominantly works in Hindi cinema. He is one of the founding members of Indian Society of Cinematographers (ISC).

Early life and education
Anil studied cinematography at the Film and Television Institute of India, Pune in 1986.

Career
Anil initially worked with Ketan Mehta on Holi (1984) and Mirch Masala (1987) while he was a student and went on to assist Barun Mukherjee on television commercials.

He debuted as a cinematographer on a short Indo-German drama film, The Cloud Door (1984). His first full length film was Khamoshi: The Musical (1996), which was also Sanjay Leela Bhansali's directorial debut.

In 1999, he won the National Film Award for Best Cinematography for his work in Hum Dil De Chuke Sanam (1999) and later worked in Lagaan (2001), which was one of the most expensive Indian films at that time.

Early 2000s and present 
He also worked on Kal Ho Naa Ho (2003), Veer-Zaara (2004), Kabhi Alvida Naa Kehna (2006) and Ae Dil Hai Mushkil (2016).

Mehta's first feature film, Aaja Nachle, was produced by Yash Raj Films which released on 30 November 2007. the film stars Madhuri Dixit (her comeback film), Konkona Sen Sharma, Akshaye Khanna and Kunal Kapoor.

Filmography

Writer 
 Agni Varsha (2002)

Director 
 Aaja Nachle (2007)

References

External links
 
 Interview by Rediff

Hindi-language film directors
Indian male screenwriters
Film and Television Institute of India alumni
Hindi film cinematographers
Living people
Best Cinematography National Film Award winners
Year of birth missing (living people)